Crazy Russian Folk And Roll Music is a 1995 album by Russian folk rock group Limpopo, who later became the Red Elvises.

Track listing

 Gop-Stop 
 Porushcka-Porania 
 Korobeyniki
 My Angel 
 By the Blue, Blue Sea 
 Nese Galya Vodu 
 Rok Eraund Ze Klok 
 My Husband the Sailor 
 Besa Me Mucho
 Ochi Chorniye
 Candle 
 Katiusha
 Moscow Nights
 Traditional Russian Rock'n'Roll 
 Those Were the Days
 Chastushki
 Wap-Pap 
 You Let Me Down/Fried Chicken 
 Special Russian Folk Song 
 Kalinka

External links
 Official site

1995 albums
Red Elvises albums